Franco Valle (15 February 1940 – 10 April 2003) was an Italian boxer who won a bronze medal at the 1964 Olympics. After that he turned professional, but had limited success, and retired in 1966 with a record of 3-3.

1964 Olympic boxing results
Below is the record of Franco Valle, an Italian middleweight boxer who competed at the 1964 Tokyo Olympics:

 Round of 32: bye
 Round of 16: defeated Leonidas Cezar (Brazil) by decision, 4-1
 Quarterfinal: defeated Guillermo Salinas (Chile) by decision, 5-0
 Semifinal: lost to Emil Schulz (United Team of Germany) by decision, 0-5 (awarded bronze medal)

References

Middleweight boxers
Olympic boxers of Italy
Boxers at the 1964 Summer Olympics
Olympic bronze medalists for Italy
1940 births
2003 deaths
Sportspeople from Genoa
Olympic medalists in boxing
Italian male boxers
Medalists at the 1964 Summer Olympics